Old North Sacramento is a planned train station that will be a stop on Altamont Corridor Express and Amtrak California's San Joaquin services. The station is located near the intersection of El Monte Avenue and Acoma Street. To be constructed as part of the Valley Rail project, it is expected to open by 2029. The Sacramento RT Light Rail Globe station is located nearby to the east.

References

Railway stations in Sacramento County, California
Transportation in Sacramento, California
Future Amtrak stations in the United States
Railway stations scheduled to open in 2029
Future Altamont Corridor Express stations